The 1987–88 Virginia Cavaliers men's basketball team represented the University of Virginia during the 1987–88 NCAA Division I men's basketball season. The team was led by fourteenth-year head coach Terry Holland, and played their home games at University Hall in Charlottesville, Virginia as members of the Atlantic Coast Conference.

Roster

Schedule and results

|-
!colspan=9 style=| Non-Conference Regular season

|-
!colspan=9 style=| ACC Regular season

|-
!colspan=9 style=| ACC Tournament

References

Virginia Cavaliers men's basketball seasons
Virginia
Virgin
Virgin